Amelia Earhart: The Final Flight (also known as Amelia Earhart) is a 1994 American biographical television film directed by Yves Simoneau, written by Anna Sandor, and starring Diane Keaton, Rutger Hauer and Bruce Dern. The film is based on the 1987 book Amelia Earhart: A Biography by Doris L. Rich, and depicts events in the life of Amelia Earhart, focusing on her final flight and disappearance in 1937, with her exploits in aviation and her marriage to publisher George P. Putnam being revealed in flashbacks. It aired on TNT on June 12, 1994.

Plot
In 1928, Amelia Earhart gains fame by undertaking a transatlantic flight, albeit as a passenger. Her marriage to media tycoon George Palmer Putnam and a series of record-breaking flights propel her to international fame as a long-distance flyer. With help from a close friend and adviser, Paul Mantz, Earhart and her navigator, the hard-drinking Fred Noonan, undertake her longest flight ever: a round-the-world attempt in 1937. The airplane disappears, and a massive search effort is unsuccessful, but solidifies Earhart as an aviation icon.

Cast

Production
Principal photography began on October 18, 1993, with studio work as well as location shooting in both California and Quebec. Although a Beech D18 was used, it was an adequate substitute for Earhart's famed Lockheed Model 10 Electra used in the circumnavigational flight of the globe in 1937. Well-known race pilot Steve Hinton, president of the Planes of Fame Air Museum and owner of Fighter Rebuilders, flew for the film. The cockpit section of the Beech aircraft used (actually the US Navy variant, an SNB-5) is now on display at Lyon Air Museum in Orange County, California, as part of a hands-on education area.

Reception
Interest in the story of Amelia Earhart, especially with the release of Amelia in 2009, led film reviewers to recall the earlier Earhart portrayals. Rosalind Russell had played "an Earhart-esque flier in 1943's Flight for Freedom" and Susan Clark starred in the 1976 film, Amelia Earhart.

Following closely the contemporary Earhart biographies that had appeared, Amelia Earhart: The Final Flight dramatized Earhart's final flight to the extent that more myth than fact comes through. Reviews of the performances in Amelia Earhart: The Final Flight were mixed, with some observers noting that the depictions were not true to the character of the historical figures that were portrayed.<ref>Phillips, Joseph. "Amelia Earhart - The Final Flight (1994) Diane Keaton." ' 'Rare TV on DVD. Retrieved: May 3, 2012.</ref>

Keaton's understated portrayal of Earhart resulted in nominations for a 1995 Golden Globe and a 1995 Emmy for Lead Actress in a Miniseries or Special, as well as a 1995 Screen Actors Guild Award nomination. Editor Michael D. Ornstein won the 1995 CableACE Award for Editing while the production also garnered nominations for an American Society of Cinematographers, (ASC) Award for Outstanding Achievement in Cinematography in Movies of the Week/Pilots and an Emmy nomination for Single Camera Editing in a Miniseries/Special for 1995."Amelia Earhart: The Final Flight (1994) Awards." imdb. Retrieved: May 4, 2012.

References
Notes

Bibliography

 Butler, Susan. East to the Dawn: The Life of Amelia Earhart. Reading, Massachusetts: Addison-Wesley, 1997. .
 Goldstein, Donald M. and Katherine V. Dillon. Amelia: The Centennial Biography of an Aviation Pioneer. Washington, D.C.: Brassey's, 2009, first edition 1997. .
 Lovell, Mary S. The Sound of Wings: The Life of Amelia Earhart. New York: St. Martin's Press, 1989. .
 Rich, Doris L. Amelia Earhart: A Biography''. Washington, D.C.: Smithsonian Institution Press, 1989. .

External links
 
 
 
 

1994 films
1990s biographical films
American aviation films
American biographical films
Biographical television films
Cultural depictions of Amelia Earhart
Films based on biographies
Films directed by Yves Simoneau
Films scored by George S. Clinton
Films set in the 1920s
Films set in the 1930s
Films shot in California
Films shot in Quebec
Television films based on books
TNT Network original films
Biographical films about aviators
1990s American films